Democratic Republican Party may refer to:

Democratic Republican Alliance, a defunct political party in France also known as the Democratic Republican Party
Democratic-Republican Party, a defunct political party in the United States
Democratic Republican Party (Portugal), a political party in Portugal
Democratic Republican Party (South Korea), a defunct political party in South Korea
Democratic Republican Party (South Korea, 2008), a minor political party in South Korea